"Neon Gravestones" is a song by the American musical duo Twenty One Pilots. It is the seventh track from their fifth studio album, Trench (2018). Tyler Joseph, the frontman of the band, wrote the song and produced it with Paul Meany. It is a hip hop piano ballad which deals with the glorification of suicide by the media.

Upon the album's release, "Neon Gravestones" attracted moderate media attention for its potentially controversial take on suicide. Nevertheless, the song received generally positive reviews from music critics. It was a part of the set list for the band's Bandito Tour (2018–2019), and Joseph also performed a piano version of the song for BBC Radio 1's Live Lounge on November 2, 2018.

Background 

The song was written and recorded by Tyler Joseph in his basement and produced with the help of Paul Meany of alternative rock band Mutemath. Apart from the band's drummer Josh Dun, Joseph, and Meany, no one, including friends and family, was allowed to be present during the songwriting process; this was in order to not influence the song's direction. Some publications, including Billboard, have interpreted the "neon", which is often used for advertising, as a fake light, attracting someone towards death. Several music journalists have described the ending as directly linked to Trench's penultimate track, "Legend", which pays homage to Joseph's late grandfather, Robert, who appeared on the album cover of the band's first major label album, Vessel (2013).

In an October 2018 interview with Kerrang!, Joseph revealed that he was uneasy about the placement of the song in the middle of the Trench, having heard concerns from outside opinions that it affected the flow of the album. He decided to keep the song in its place, believing it to be "the heart of Trench". Joseph was also worried about the sensitivity of the track, as was Dun, but both agreed to keep the song on the album. Executives at Atlantic Records were also "extremely concerned" by the song, with Joseph recalling in an interview that they described it as a "giant landmine in the middle of the record" and were concerned that if its message were misinterpreted it could potentially be career-ending for the band.

Some publications noted that the song could have been written in response to various celebrity suicides, such as those of Chester Bennington and Scott Hutchison, and the popularity of the Netflix series 13 Reasons Why. Joseph also explained that the song was "a reaction to what was happening in our culture", but added that he was still proud of "our culture," although his pride in it had been declining. He nonetheless "felt inclined to bring up a new perspective – a perspective that comes off a bit more aggressive and more of a challenge". In another interview, Joseph said that he feared it would be bordering on disrespect if he answered a fan's question on whether one particular death had caused him to write the song.

Composition and lyrics 

"Neon Gravestones" is forlorn, slow-burning hip hop piano ballad that runs for a duration of four minutes. According to the sheet music published at Musicnotes.com by Alfred Publishing, it is written in the time signature of common time, with a fast tempo of 150 beats per minute. "Neon Gravestones" is composed in the key of B minor. The song has a basic sequence of Bm–Fm7–A6–Esus2–Gmaj13–G6–Gmaj7 during the introduction, changes to Bm–F5–Asus2–EG–G6–G–G6 in the verses and chorus and follows A–Bm–Em6/G–D at the bridge, interludes and coda as its chord progression. The musical composition is built on swirling piano and jittery calibrated drums. A somber  piano riff runs throughout atop electronic percussion, steadily picking up pace over time. Joseph alternates between singing and spoken word rapping, while pitching his voice to sound "especially fragile, hoarse, and tentative."

Lyrically, "Neon Gravestones" attacks the media's glorification of suicide. Joseph challenges pop culture at large for not taking the mental health of troubled musicians more seriously while reckoning with the aftermath of numerous celebrity musicians who have taken their own lives. His balladic lyrics address the suicide crisis as well as other forms of untimely death. The sensitive song harbors plainly introspective lyrics where Joseph frankly discusses suicide, speaking with first-person singular pronouns rather than in royal "we". Joseph argues there lies a culture of romanticizing celebrity suicides and grapples with the idea that perhaps some artists who choose to leave the world do so with their legacy in mind. These cultural tendencies communicate a message that "an earlier grave is an optional way." Tyler Joseph closes the song by pleading for suicide not to be glorified and to suggests paying respects to the elderly who have remained alive.

During his songs, Joseph often engages audiences in a non-literal approach. However, "Neon Gravestones" is one of the tracks on Trench where he abandons  characters and concepts and instead directly states what he means. Joseph explained that the lyrics were "black and white" rather than metaphorical like most of the band's songs, as he didn't want "beautiful, pretty metaphors" distracting the listener from "the importance of the topic". He also described the track as "a view into the deeper reasons of what's going on in Dema that feels like I have to leave". Joseph later told Alternative Press that the song was one that you have to live with for a while, one you have to "give oxygen and let it breathe". Dun added that the two of them generally agreed in regard to spiritual or political subjects, which was one of the reasons why they made the track.

Critical reception 
The song was met with positive reviews from music critics, though most noted that it may attract some controversy for its unconventional take on suicide. Billboard journalist Paige Williams wrote that the song may redeem the band from those who saw them as glamorizing depression in the past. Christopher R. Weingarten of Rolling Stone said the song "is the most intense look at fame... moody and reflective". NME's Gary Ryan called the song a highlight of the album, an "elegiac, touching broadside against the fetishization of the 27 Club". Stereogums Chris DeVille called the song "an unusual message in modern pop music, but unsurprising for a group that put their grandfathers on the cover of their major-label debut." Joshua Copperman, writing for PopMatters, deemed the song "the most compelling track" off Trench, but called its ending "too pat" compared to the rest of the song. Jason Pettigrew of Alternative Press placed it at number 29 on his ranking of all of the band's songs as of September 2019, hailing the song as "a brave statement in a troubling time".

Spencer Kornhaber of The Atlantic was more critical of "Neon Gravestones" regarding its message, arguing that to "deny" fans the right to pay homage to any deceased artist upon their death may be too cruel considering the impact of and affection attached to the artist's work. He continued, writing that "the song is less a coherent argument than a series of questions—tough ones about the departed, and tougher ones for those left behind". Pettigrew noted in an interview with the band that the song was one of the most controversial of their career. Calling it an "anti-suicide-glorifying anthem," Chris Willman of Variety said the song may be debated "not just by fans but some of the mental health specialists who track pop culture's statements on this stuff in the months to come". Martin Williams of The Herald predicted that the song would "undoubtedly received a kneejerk response of insensitivity to victims with lines like: 'I'm not disrespecting what was left behind / just pleading that it does not get glorified'".

Credits and personnel
Credits adapted from the liner notes of Trench and Twenty One Pilots' official YouTube channel.

Recording and management
 Published by Warner-Tamerlane publishing Corp. (BMI) and Stryker Joseph Music (BMI)
 Recorded in Tyler Joseph's home studio, Columbus, Ohio
 Mastered at Sterling Sound, New York, New York

Twenty One Pilots
 Tyler Joseph  – vocals, piano, bass guitar, synthesizers, programming, songwriting, production
 Josh Dun  – drums, backing vocals
Additional personnel
 Paul Meany  – synthesizers, programming, production
 Adam Hawkins  – mixing
 Chris Gehringer  – mastering

Charts

References 

2018 songs
Songs written by Tyler Joseph
Twenty One Pilots songs
Spoken word
Songs about suicide
2010s ballads